WVLY (1370 AM) is a radio station broadcasting a News Talk Information format. Licensed to Moundsville, West Virginia, United States, the station is currently owned by RCK 1 Group, LLC.

WVLY is the current radio home of former U.S. Rep. Bob Ney

Translator

External links

VLY